Queniquea is a town in Táchira, Venezuela. It is the capital of Sucre Municipality. It has a population of 20.000.

Former president Eleazar López Contreras was born there.
Source: Wikipedia in Spanish.

See also
Municipalities of Venezuela

Populated places in Táchira